53rd Street may refer to:

 53rd Street (Manhattan), a midtown cross street in New York City

New York City Subway
53rd Street (BMT Fourth Avenue Line), in Brooklyn; serving the  trains
Fifth Avenue / 53rd Street (IND Queens Boulevard Line), in Manhattan; serving the  trains
Lexington Avenue – 53rd Street (IND Queens Boulevard Line), also in Manhattan; serving the  trains
53rd Street (IRT Third Avenue Line), a defunct aboveground station in Manhattan, closed 1955

Elsewhere
53rd Street (Hyde Park) (Metra), a commuter train station in Chicago